The Digital Switchover (Disclosure of Information) Act 2007 is an Act of the Parliament of the United Kingdom that allows social security information to be passed to the BBC and related parties to help with the digital television switchover in the United Kingdom.

Background
The Digital Switchover Help Scheme was established and funded by the BBC to provide free advice to:
All households with one person aged 75 or over;
All households with one person with a severe disability, being in receipt of Disability Living Allowance, Attendance Allowance or other equivalents under the Industrial Injuries Disablement Benefit scheme and pre-2005 war pension schemes; and
All households where at least one person is registered blind or partially sighted.

The intention of the Act was to help people receive assistance from the Scheme without having to go through a claims process. The UK switchover started in October 2007 in the town of Whitehaven and the Act came too late to adequately prepare the town. The BBC, through their consultants Capita, had to resort to writing to all the town's residents to invite them to apply under the Scheme. The Act was supported by Help the Aged, Age Concern, the National Consumer Council, Royal National Institute for the Blind, Royal National Institute for the Deaf and the National Association of Citizens Advice Bureaux.

Disclosure
Information on disability and age can only be disclosed for:
Identification of persons who may be eligible for help under the Scheme;
Making contact with such persons with a view to the provision of such help; and
Establishment of any person’s entitlement to such help.

Further specification of the information that can be disclosed is given by Statutory Instrument.

It is a crime to disclose information received under the Act, other than in summary form. An offender can be sentenced on summary conviction to up to six months' imprisonment and a fine of up to £5,000. If convicted on indictment in the Crown Court and offender can be sentenced to up to two years' imprisonment and an unlimited fine.

If the offence is committed by a body corporate and with the consent or connivance of an officer, director or manager, that person is also guilty of an offence.

Territorial extent
The Act purports to extend by an Order in Council to the Isle of Man. The Isle of Man is a Crown dependency and the power of the Parliament of the United Kingdom to legislate for the dependency is a confused and controversial matter.

References

External links
The Digital Switchover (Disclosure of Information) Act 2007, as amended from the National Archives.
The Digital Switchover (Disclosure of Information) Act 2007, as originally enacted from the National Archives.
Explanatory notes to the Digital Switchover (Disclosure of Information) Act 2007.

United Kingdom Acts of Parliament 2007
Broadcast law
Acts of the Parliament of the United Kingdom concerning the Isle of Man
Digital television in the United Kingdom